Niiya (written: 新谷) may refer to:

 (born 1988), Japanese long-distance runner
, train station in Ehime Prefecture, Japan
Niiya (company), established in 1684

Japanese-language surnames